The Canon EOS-1V is a 35mm single-lens reflex camera from Canon's EOS series, released in 2000. The body design formed the basis for Canon's subsequent Canon EOS-1D and EOS-1Ds families of digital SLRs. The 1V was the last model of Canon professional film cameras before it was discontinued on May 30, 2018.

Canon used the suffix 'v' because the camera introduced the fifth generation of Canon professional SLRs, after the Canon F-1 and New F-1, the Canon T90, and earlier EOS 1 models; Canon also stated that the 'v' stands for "vision".

The EOS 1V was the fastest moving-mirror film camera ever put into production at the time it was introduced, at 10 frames/second with the PB-E2 power drive booster and the NP-E2 Ni-MH battery pack. (Although the 1nRS has a higher frame rate, it used a fixed pellicle mirror rather than a moving mirror). Only the latest professional digital cameras are faster, for example the Canon EOS-1D X Mark II with 16fps.

References

External links
 
 

1V